An Educational Consultant (EC) is an advisor who helps parents and students with educational planning for high school, college, and graduate school.

Overview
An educational consultant offers services that are similar to school counselors and academic advisors, but is normally self-employed or employed by a larger educational organization. According to the National Association of Independent Schools, an educational consultant is someone who can: "assess [a] child’s talents, learning style, and ideal learning environment," "explain the different types of schools and which students each school serves best," "identify schools that fit [a] student’s needs," "gauge whether a particular school is right for [a] child," "explain the application process, calendar, and deadlines," "help [students and families] prepare for campus visits, admission tests, and interviews," "offer advice and support throughout the admissions process."

Ethics
IECA's "Ethical Guidelines for the Profession of Educational Consulting" states that it "has developed a strict set of ethical guidelines that govern the actions of consultants in their relationships with students and families, schools and colleges, and with colleagues. These include a responsibility to understand each student's special strengths, values and needs, while striving to include all family members in the educational planning process. An IECA member does not accept any compensation from educational institutions for placement of a child. All IECA members subscribe to these Principles of Good Practice and all IECA members are required to annually sign and follow the principles as part of their Association membership in good standing." HECA has also set a "Standard and Ethics" policy for all HECA members.

Professional organizations
The two main professional organizations for educational consultants are the IECA (Independent Educational Consultants Association) and HECA (Higher Education Consultants Association). The primary association in the UK is the Society of Education Consultants (SEC).

See also
Loren Pope - best known for his book, Colleges That Change Lives.

References

External links
Official Certificate Programs (online)
College Admissions and Career Planning - University of California, Berkeley, Extension
Independent Educational Consultant - University of California, Irvine, Division of Continuing Education
College Counseling - University of California, Los Angeles, Extension
College Admissions Counseling - University of California, Riverside, University Extension Professional Studies
College Counseling - University of California, San Diego, Extended Stuides

Advisors
Consulting occupations
Education
Private schools
University and college admissions